Opinaca Reservoir is a lake in the northwest of the province of Quebec in Canada. It is located 140 km east of James Bay, south of the Robert-Bourassa Reservoir and south of Lac Sakami. It is connected by a 41 km narrows to the Eastmain Reservoir located east.

See also
List of lakes of Quebec

References

External links
fr:Réservoir Opinaca

Lakes of Nord-du-Québec